Eisenhauer is a surname derived from the German word , meaning "iron hewer". Other forms of the name include Eisenhower and Isenhour.

Notable people with the name include:

Elizabeth Eisenhauer, Canadian oncologist
Frank Eisenhauer (born 1968), German astronomer and astrophysicist
James Daniel Eisenhauer (1832–1896), a Canadian merchant and politician
Larry Eisenhauer (born 1940), an American football player
Letty Eisenhauer (born 1935), an American performance artist and forensic psychologist
Nico Eisenhauer (born 1980), German biologist and soil ecologist
Peggy Eisenhauer, an American lighting designer
Steve Eisenhauer (born 1932), an American football player

See also
Eisenhower (surname)
W. Stine Isenhower (1927-2023), American politician

German-language surnames